Pilot officer (Plt Off officially in the RAF;  in the RAAF and RNZAF; formerly P/O in all services, and still often used in the RAF) is the lowest commissioned rank in the Royal Air Force and the air forces of many other Commonwealth countries. It ranks immediately below flying officer.

It has a NATO ranking code of OF-1 and is equivalent to a second lieutenant in the British Army or the Royal Marines. The Royal Navy has no exact equivalent rank, and a pilot officer is senior to a Royal Navy midshipman and junior to a Royal Navy sub-lieutenant.  In the Australian Armed Forces, the rank of pilot officer is equivalent to acting sub lieutenant in the Royal Australian Navy.

The equivalent rank in the Women's Auxiliary Air Force (WAAF) was "assistant section officer".

Origins
In the Royal Flying Corps, officers were designated pilot officers at the end of pilot training. As they retained their commissions in their customary ranks (usually second lieutenant or lieutenant), and many of them had been seconded from their ground units, the designation of pilot officer was a position title rather than a rank.

On 1 April 1918, the newly created RAF adopted its officer rank titles from the British Army, with Royal Flying Corps second lieutenants becoming second lieutenants in the RAF. Consideration was given to renaming second lieutenants as ensigns.  However, when the RAF's own rank structure was introduced in August 1919, RAF second lieutenants who were qualified pilots were re-designated as pilot officers, a rank which has been in continuous use ever since. Those who were not qualified pilots were redesignated observer officers, but this was later phased out and all officers of this rank became pilot officers.

RAF usage
The rank of pilot officer does not imply that the officer is aircrew. Following recent reforms to the Royal Air Force's promotion system, wherein previously, university graduates passed out of RAF Cranwell at a higher substantive rank than their non-graduate peers, pilot officer rank is now only applicable to ground branches. Aircrew and engineers receive their commissions as flying officers and skip the rank altogether. A ground branch officer will remain in the pilot officer rank for six months following commissioning, before an automatic promotion to flying officer. Because of the nature of phase II training (professional training after the phase I initial officer training), a pilot officer will generally spend time in rank on a further training course, and is not likely to be operationally active.

Some students in the University Air Squadrons are promoted to the rank of acting pilot officer (which includes a week-long course at RAF Cranwell) as part of the leadership element of their squadron. UAS students wear pilot officer rank insignia with officer's headdress and are commissioned into the Volunteer Reserve. Pilot officers are more likely to be found in the CCF and Air Training Corps organisations of the VR(T) branch, because they are likely to spend far longer in rank than those serving in the RAF.

Insignia
The rank insignia consists of a thin blue band on slightly wider black band. This is worn on both the lower sleeves of the tunic or on the shoulders of the flying suit or the casual uniform.

Although no current Royal Navy rank has an insignia of a single half width ring, a pilot officer's mess insignia of one thin band of gold running around each cuff is similar to the insignia formerly worn by Royal Navy warrant officers.  As with the mess insignia for other RAF officer ranks, the band of gold does not have the Royal Navy's loop.

Other air forces
The rank of pilot officer is also used in a number of the air forces in the Commonwealth, including the Bangladesh Air Force, Namibian Air Force, Pakistan Air Force, Royal Australian Air Force, Royal New Zealand Air Force and Sri Lanka Air Force. The rank is no longer used by the Indian Air Force and all trainee cadets are commissioned into the force as flying officers.

The Royal Canadian Air Force used the rank until the three armed services were unified into the Canadian Forces in 1968 and army-type ranks were adopted. A Canadian pilot officer then became a second lieutenant. In official French Canadian usage, a pilot officer's rank title was sous-lieutenant d'aviation. The Royal Malaysian Air Force used "young lieutenant".

See also 

 Air force officer rank insignia
 British and U.S. military ranks compared
 Comparative military ranks
 RAF officer ranks
 Ranks of the RAAF

References

Military ranks of the Commonwealth
Military ranks of Australia
Former military ranks of Canada
Military ranks of the Royal Air Force
Air force ranks
Pakistan Air Force ranks
Military ranks of Bangladesh
Military ranks of Sri Lanka